Todd James Miller (born 2 December 1974) is a former New Zealand rugby union player. He was a member of the New Zealand national side, the All Blacks, on the 1997 tour of Ireland, Wales and England, and played four matches but no internationals.

References

1974 births
Living people
Rugby union players from Whangārei
University of Waikato alumni
Waikato rugby union players
Chiefs (rugby union) players
New Zealand rugby union players
New Zealand international rugby union players
Ngāti Hine people
Ngāpuhi people
People educated at Kamo High School
Rugby union fullbacks